The Troublemaker (Spanish:La revoltosa) is a 1963 Spanish musical film directed by José Díaz Morales and starring Teresa Lorca, Germán Cobos and Antonio Vico. The film is based on The Troublemaker an 1897 zarzuela by Carlos Fernández Shaw and José López Silva, which the director had previously turned into a 1950 film The Troublemaker. It was shot in Eastmancolor.

Cast

References

Bibliography
 Goble, Alan. The Complete Index to Literary Sources in Film. Walter de Gruyter, 1999.

External links 

1963 films
Spanish musical films
1963 musical films
1960s Spanish-language films
Films directed by José Díaz Morales
Remakes of Spanish films
1960s Spanish films